Atelopus petriruizi, more commonly known as the painted stubfoof toad, is a species of toad in the family Bufonidae. Endemic to Colombia, the toad's natural habitats are subtropical or tropical moist montane forests and rivers. Threatened by habitat loss, the Ateopus petriruizi is currently classified as critically endangered, and was placed on the IUCN red list in 2017.  Currently, there may be less than 49 remaining mature A. Petriruizi.

Sources

petriruizi
Amphibians of Colombia
Amphibians described in 1999
Taxonomy articles created by Polbot